The 2005 Grand Prix of Sonoma was the fifth race for the 2005 American Le Mans Series season, held at Infineon Raceway.  It took place on July 17, 2005. It was the last ALMS race held at Infineon. It was the final ALMS race held at Sonoma, the event being transferred to the Rolex Sports Car Series the following year.

Official results

Class winners in bold.  Cars failing to complete 70% of winner's distance marked as Not Classified (NC).

Statistics
 Pole Position - #20 Dyson Racing - 1:21.688
 Fastest Lap - #1 ADT Champion Racing - 1:22.041
 Distance - 
 Average Speed -

External links
 

S
Grand Prix of Sonoma
2005 in sports in California